Turlough O'Brien  is a Gaelic football manager. He managed Carlow between 2014 and 2020. It may also refer to:
Turlough O'Brien, High King of Ireland (1009 – 14 July 1086)
Turlough O'Brien, Lord of Thomond (died 1551) 
Turlough O'Brien (bishop) (died 1569) — a bishop in Ireland during the second half of the sixteenth century